Javier "Javi" Gómez Castroverde (born 10 January 1999) is a Spanish professional footballer who plays as an left winger for Celta de Vigo B.

Club career
Born in Toledo, Spain, Castilla–La Mancha, Gómez represented Rayo Vallecano as a youth. On 17 July 2018, after finishing his formation, he signed a three-year contract with CF Fuenlabrada in Segunda División B.

Gómez made his senior debut on 26 August 2018, coming on as a second-half substitute for Borja Lázaro in a 5–1 home routing of Salamanca CF. He scored his first goal on 2 December, netting the last of a 4–0 thrashing of Internacional de Madrid, and finished the campaign with two goals in 30 appearances as his side achieved a first-ever promotion to Segunda División.

Gómez made his professional debut on 15 September 2019, starting in a 0–2 away loss against CD Lugo. The following 27 January, after just three league appearances during the campaign, he was loaned to Celta de Vigo B in the third division, until June.

On 5 October 2020, after terminating his contract with Fuenla, Gómez signed for Burgos CF in the third division. The following 9 July, after helping in another promotion to the second division, he returned to Celta and its B-team.

References

External links

1999 births
Living people
Sportspeople from Toledo, Spain
Spanish footballers
Footballers from Castilla–La Mancha
Association football wingers
Segunda División players
Segunda División B players
Primera Federación players
CF Fuenlabrada footballers
Celta de Vigo B players
Burgos CF footballers